Minuscule 636 (in the Gregory-Aland numbering), α 598 (von Soden), is a Greek minuscule manuscript of the New Testament, on paper. Palaeographically it has been assigned to the 15th century. The manuscript has complex contents. Formerly it was labeled by 174a and 212p.

Description 

The codex contains the text of the Acts of the Apostles, Catholic epistles, Pauline epistles, on 211 paper leaves (size ). The end of the Hebrews was supplemented in the 16th century. It is written in one column per page, 22-27 lines per page.

The order of books: Acts of the Apostles, Catholic epistles, and Pauline epistles. Epistle to the Hebrews is placed after Epistle to Philemon.

It contains the Comma Johanneum in the margin added by a later hand.

Text 

Kurt Aland the Greek text of the codex did not place in any Category.

History 

The manuscript was written by Presbyter Nicolaus. It is dated by the INTF to the 15th century.

The manuscript was added to the list of New Testament manuscripts by Johann Martin Augustin Scholz, who slightly examined the major part of the manuscript. Gregory saw it in 1886.

Formerly it was labeled by 174a and 212p. In 1908 Gregory gave the number 636 to it.

The manuscript currently is housed at the Biblioteca Nazionale (Ms. II. A. 9), at Naples.

See also 

 List of New Testament minuscules
 Biblical manuscript
 Textual criticism

References

Further reading 

 

Greek New Testament minuscules
15th-century biblical manuscripts